Sergio Maximiliano Pérez Visca (born May 26, 1988 in Montevideo, Uruguay) is a Uruguayan footballer currently playing for Deportes Concepción of the Primera División B in Chile.

Teams
  Peñarol 2007-2008
  Tacuarembó FC 2008
  Cerro 2009
  Peñarol 2009-2010
  Cerro 2010-2011
  Racing de Montevideo 2011
  Cerro 2012
  Central Español 2012
  Almirante Brown 2013–2014
  Deportes Concepción 2014–present

References
 
 
 

1988 births
Living people
Uruguayan footballers
Uruguayan expatriate footballers
Peñarol players
C.A. Cerro players
Central Español players
Tacuarembó F.C. players
Racing Club de Montevideo players
Deportes Concepción (Chile) footballers
Club Almirante Brown footballers
Primera B de Chile players
Expatriate footballers in Chile
Expatriate footballers in Argentina
Association football forwards